Daniel Asa Rose is an American author (memoirs, novels, short stories, essays, reviews, poems, travel, humor), journalist, and editor.

Biography
His most recent book is "LARRY'S KIDNEY: Being the True Story of How I Found Myself in China With my Black Sheep Cousin and His Mail-Order Bride, Skirting the Law to Get Him a Transplant ... and Save His Life" (Morrow, 2009) which was named “one of the top books of the year” by Publishers Weekly and is slated to be made into a movie directed by Richard ("Boyhood") Linklater.  He has won many awards including a National Endowment for the Arts Literature Fellowship in writing.  His novel, “FLIPPING FOR IT,” a black comedy about divorce written from the man’s point of view, was a New York Times New and Notable Paperback.

His short story collection, “SMALL FAMILY WITH ROOSTER,” included stories selected for two PEN Awards and for inclusion in the O. Henry Prize Stories.  His memoir, “HIDING PLACES:  A Father and his Sons Retrace Their Family's Escape From the Holocaust,” earned starred reviews in both Publishers Weekly (“brilliant”) and Kirkus Reviews (“remarkable”), as well as the New England Booksellers Discovery Award and inclusion in “Best Jewish Writing 2003.”

Formerly the arts & culture editor of the Forward newspaper, he has published in The New Yorker, Esquire, GQ, Vanity Fair, The New York Observer, New York Magazine, The New York Times Magazine, The New York Times Book Review, Playboy, Ploughshares, North American Review, Partisan Review, Southern Review, et al.

Personal
Born to a cosmopolitan family in New York City and raised in Rowayton, Conn, Rose graduated in English Honors from Brown University, where he was awarded an honorary Phi Beta Kappa. He won "Best Actor Award" at the Abbey Theater in Dublin before fleeing the stage for a life in writing.  Currently he serves as Writer-in-Residence at Western Connecticut State University’s MFA program in professional writing, and acts as editor of The Reading Room, an international literary magazine based in NYC. He has four sons by two wives, including actor Jeremy Roth-Rose, and divides his time between Providence, R.I., New York City, and the southern New Mexico desert, where he is working on a new memoir.

References

External links

DAR on NPR's The Diane Rehm Show
Most recent op ed in the New York Times
DAR on CNN

Living people
American male writers
Year of birth missing (living people)